GTF may stand for:

Companies and organizations
 Georgia Tech Foundation
 German Taekwondo Federation
 German Taxpayers Federation
 German Tennis Federation
 Global Tamil Forum
 Global Thinkers Forum, in London, England
 Graduate Theological Foundation, in Indiana
 Graphic Thought Facility, a British graphic design agency

Science
 Gene transfer format, a file format
 General transcription factor, a class of protein transcription factors
 Glucose tolerance factor
 Glycosyltransferase
 Green tree frog (disambiguation)

Technology
 Generalized Timing Formula, a video timings standard
 Geared turbofan
 Pratt & Whitney GTF, a turbofan engine

Other
 Great Falls International Airport, in Montana
Guam Telecommunications Facility